Conus pseudocardinalis is a species of sea snail, a marine gastropod mollusk in the family Conidae, the cone snails, cone shells or cones.

These snails are predatory and venomous. They are capable of "stinging" humans.

Description
The size of the shell varies between 14 mm and 32 mm.

Distribution
This marine species occurs off the Abrolhos Archipelago, Eastern Brasil.

References

 Coltro, J. Jr. 2004. New species of Conidae from northeastern Brazil (Mollusca: Gastropoda). Strombus 11: 1-16
 Puillandre N., Duda T.F., Meyer C., Olivera B.M. & Bouchet P. (2015). One, four or 100 genera? A new classification of the cone snails. Journal of Molluscan Studies. 81: 1-23

External links
 To World Register of Marine Species
 

pseudocardinalis
Gastropods described in 2004